Issaka is an African given name that may refer to
Given name
Issaka Hassane (born 1959), track and field sprinter who competed for Chad 
Issaka Samaké, Malian football defender 
Issaka Sidibé (born 1946), Malian politician
Issaka Souna (born 1954), Nigerien politician

Surname
Aichatou Ousmane Issaka, social worker in Niger
Awudu Issaka (born 1979), Ghanaian footballer
Hamadou Djibo Issaka (born 1977), Nigerien athlete

See also
Isaka
Isakas